Farzaneh Tavasoli (Persian: فرزانه توسلی, born January 19, 1987, in Tehran, Iran) is an Iranian futsal player. She is currently the goalkeeper and captain of Iran women's national futsal team and a member of the Peykan Tehran women's futsal team.

Tavasoli is considered one of the golden generation of Iranian women's futsal players who succeeded in winning two consecutive AFC Women's Futsal Championship championships for Iran.

Honors

Player

Club 

 Winning the Iranian Women's Futsal Premier League 2007 with Esteghlal Jonoub Dezful
 Winning the Iranian Women's Futsal Premier League 2008 with Rah Ahan Tehran
 Winning the Iranian Women's Futsal Premier League 2009 with Tejarat Khane Bandar Abbas
 Winning the Iranian Women's Futsal Premier League 2010 with Tejarat Khane Bandar Abbas
 Winning the Iranian Women's Futsal Premier League 2012 with Meli Hafari Ahvaz
 Winning the Iranian Women's Futsal Premier League 2013 with Meli Hafari Ahvaz
 Winning the Iranian Women's Futsal Premier League 2015 with Islamic Azad University
 Winning the Iranian Women's Futsal Premier League 2017 with Palayesh Naft Abadan
 Winning the Iranian Women's Futsal Premier League 2018 with Namino Esfahan

National 
 Champion in Futsal Tournaments of Islamic and Asian Capitals (Iran 2005)
 Championship in West Asian Futsal Tournament (Jordan 2008)
 Runner-up in the Asian women's indoor futsal tournament (South Korea 2013)
 Champion in the AFC Women's Futsal Championship (Malaysia 2015)
 3rd place in the Asian women's indoor futsal tournament (Turkmenistan 2017)
 Champion in the AFC Women's Futsal Championship (Thailand 2018)
 Champion in the CAFA Women's Futsal Championship (Tajikistan 2022)

Individual 

 The best goalkeeper of Iranian Women's Futsal Premier League 2007
 The best goalkeeper of the Russian women's futsal tournament (2014)
 The best goalkeeper of the AFC Women's Futsal Championship (Malaysia 2015)
 The best goalkeeper of Iranian Women's Futsal Premier League 2015
 The seventh best goalkeeper in the world in 2015
 The best goalkeeper of Iranian Women's Futsal Premier League 2017
 The best goalkeeper of the AFC Women's Futsal Championship (Thailand 2018)
 The sixth best goalkeeper in the world in 2018 
 The sixth best goalkeeper in the world in 2019

References 

1987 births
Living people
Sportspeople from Tehran
Iranian women's futsal players
Futsal goalkeepers